The Florida sand skink (Plestiodon reynoldsi) is a species of lizard in the family Scincidae, the skinks. It is endemic to Florida in the United States.

Taxonomy and etymology
It was described as a new genus and new species by Leonhard Stejneger in 1910 and named in honor of a certain Mr. A.G. Reynolds of Gulfport, Florida, who had collected the holotype.

Description

A unique lizard adapted to an underground existence, the Florida sand skink measures  in total length and is a gray to tan color. Its forelegs are tiny and bear only one toe each; its hindlegs are small and have two toes. The tail comprises about half of the animal's total length. The sand skink has a wedge-shaped head, a partially countersunk lower jaw, body grooves into which the forelegs can be folded, and small eyes which have transparent windows in the lower lids. These features enable the lizard to move through loose sand.

Diet
The diet consists of surface-dwelling invertebrates, including termites, spiders, and the larvae of antlions and beetles.

Reproduction
Florida sand skinks are most active in spring, during their mating season. They reach sexual maturity after one to two years and remain reproductively active for two to three years. About 55 days after mating, the female lays about two eggs, which hatch in June or July.

Geographic range
It only occurs in Central Florida—115 known sites were recorded in 1999. The species is difficult to detect and may be found elsewhere during more intensive searches. It is present on the Lake Wales Ridge, the Winter Haven Ridge in Polk County, and the Mount Dora Ridge.

Habitat
The Florida sand skink lives in areas vegetated with sand pine–Florida rosemary scrub and the longleaf pine–American turkey oak association, including Florida scrub habitat. Food supply and moisture levels are important factors in the species' tolerance of habitat. Florida sand skinks are most frequently found in the ecotone between Florida rosemary scrub and palmetto-pine flatwoods where moisture is present beneath the surface litter and in the sand.

Behavior
It usually remains underground and burrows  beneath the soil to find food.

Conservation status
The Florida sand skink was classified as a threatened species by the United States Fish and Wildlife Service in 1987. As of 2016 it is classified as vulnerable by the IUCN due to ongoing habitat destruction for the purpose of building developments, citrus plantations, phosphate mining, and wildfires.

References

External links
Comprehensive overview with extensive literature list.

Further reading
Behler, J.L.; King, F.W. (1979). The Audubon Society Field Guide to North American Reptiles and Amphibians. New York: Alfred A. Knopf. 743 pp. . (Neoseps reynoldsi, p. 578 + Plate 450).
Conant, R. (1975). A Field Guide to Reptiles and Amphibians of Eastern and Central North America. Boston: Houghton Mifflin Company. xviii + 429 pp. + Plates 1-48.  (hardcover),  (paperback). (Neoseps reynoldsi, p. 131 + Plate 19 + Map 83).
Goin, C.J.; Goin, O.B.; Zug, G.R. (1978). Introduction to Herpetology, Third Edition. San Francisco: W.H. Freeman and Company. 378 pp. . (Neoseps, pp. 301, 304).
Smith, H.M.; Brodie, E.D., Jr. (1982). Reptiles of North America: A Guide to Field Identification. New York: Golden Press. 240 pp. . (Neoseps reynoldsi, pp. 80–81).
Stejneger, L. (1910). "A new genus and species of Lizard from Florida". Proceedings of the United States National Museum 39: 33-35. (Neoseps, new genus, p. 33; Neoseps reynoldsi, new species, pp. 34–35, Figures 1-6).
Sutton, P.E. (1996). A mark and recapture study of the Florida sand skink Neoseps reynoldsi and a comparison of sand skink sampling methods. Master's thesis, University of South Florida; Tampa, Florida.
Telford, S.R. (1959). "A study of the sand skink, Neoseps reynoldsi ". Copeia 1959 (2): 100-119.
Zim, H.S.; Smith, H.M. (1956). Reptiles and Amphibians: A Guide to Familiar American Species. New York: Simon and Schuster. 160 pp. (Neoseps reynoldsi, pp. 64, 155).

Plestiodon
Endemic fauna of Florida
Reptiles of the United States
Reptiles described in 1910
Taxa named by Leonhard Stejneger
ESA threatened species